Love Is Not Perfect is a 2012 Italian romance film written and directed by Francesca Muci in her directorial debut, and starring Anna Foglietta and Giulio Berruti. The screenplay is based on the 2012 Italian novel of the same name, written by Francesca Muci.

Produced by Tilde Corsi and Gianni Romoli, Love Is Not Perfect premiered in Italy on 29 November 2012.

Cast 
Anna Foglietta as Elena
Giulio Berruti as Marco
 Bruno Wolkowitch as Ettore
 Lorena Cacciatore as Adriana
 Camilla Filippi as Roberta

Plot
Thirty-five year old Elena works for a publishing house. She has chosen to live as a single woman after her long-lasting but unsatisfying relationship with Marco, a free-lance photographer, ended when she discovered him flirting with another man in a restaurant.

After a minor accident on a scooter she meets Adriana, a seductive young woman, and Ettore, an older man.  Attracted to Adriana's unpredictability, which offers excitement and passion, and Ettore's calmness, which provides stability and security, Elena finds herself torn between the two and enters into a relationship with both in pursuit of love.

Production
Asked about the sex scene with Bruno Wolkowitch, Anna Foglietta said that it created some problems with their respective partners in real life. "In the scene Wolkowitch tears off my bra with enthusiasm and gropes my tits. Then he throws me on the bed and slips his hand under my skirt. After the 'cut', I was afraid I had done something bad because he, upset, kept calling his wife repeating: 'I love you, I love you'. It is never easy to make certain scenes, they can shake you a lot."

See also
 List of Italian films of 2012

References

Further reading

External links
 
 L'amore è imperfetto at Appuntamento al Cinema, Associazione Nazionale Industrie Cinematografiche Audiovisive e Digitali (Italian Association of Film, Audiovisual and Digital Industry)
 
2012 films
2012 LGBT-related films
2012 romantic drama films
Italian LGBT-related films
Italian romantic drama films
Bisexuality-related films
Female bisexuality in film
Lesbian-related films
LGBT-related romantic drama films
Films scored by Manuel De Sica
2010s Italian films